The Eighty-five Martyrs of England and Wales, also known as George Haydock and Eighty-four Companion Martyrs, are a group of men who were executed on charges of treason and related offences in the Kingdom of England between 1584 and 1679. Of the eighty-five, seventy-five (sixty-one priests and fourteen laymen) were executed under Jesuits, etc. Act 1584.

They are considered martyrs in the Roman Catholic Church and were beatified on 22 November 1987 by Pope John Paul II.

List of individual names
They were chosen from a number of priests and laymen executed between 1584 and 1679. Their names are:

John Adams
Thomas Atkinson
Edward Bamber
George Beesley
Arthur Bell
Thomas Belson
Robert Bickerdike
Alexander Blake
Marmaduke Bowes
John Britton
Thomas Bullaker
Edward Burden
Roger Cadwallador
William Carter
Alexander Crow
William Davies
Robert Dibdale
George Douglas
Robert Drury
Edmund Duke
George Errington
Roger Filcock
John Fingley
Matthew Flathers
Richard Flower
Nicholas Garlick
William Gibson
Ralph Grimston
Robert Grissold
John Hambley
Robert Hardesty
George Haydock
Henry Heath
Richard Hill
John Hogg
Richard Holiday
Nicholas Horner
Thomas Hunt
Thurstan Hunt
Francis Ingleby
William Knight
Joseph Lambton
William Lampley
John Lowe
Robert Ludlam
Charles Mahoney
Robert Middleton
George Nichols
John Norton
Robert Nutter
Edward Osbaldeston
Anthony Page
Thomas Palasor
William Pike
Thomas Pilchard
Thomas Pormort
Nicholas Postgate
Humphrey Pritchard
Christopher Robinson
Stephen Rowsham
John Sandys
Montford Scott
Richard Sergeant
Richard Simpson
Peter Snow
William Southerne
William Spenser
Thomas Sprott
John Sugar
Robert Sutton
Edmund Sykes
John Talbot
Hugh Taylor
William Thomson
Robert Thorpe
John Thules
Edward Thwing
Thomas Watkinson
Henry Webley
Christopher Wharton
Thomas Whittaker
John Woodcock
Nicholas Woodfen
Roger Wrenno
Richard Yaxley

Liturgical Feast Day
In England, these martyrs, together with those beatified between 1886 and 1929, are commemorated by a feast day on 4 May. This day also honours the Forty Martyrs of England and Wales who hold the rank of saint; the Forty Martyrs were honoured separately on 25 October until the liturgical calendar for England was revised in the year 2000.

In Wales, 4 May specifically commemorates the beatified martyrs of England and Wales. Five of the martyrs named in this group of 85, Three – William Davies, Humphrey Pritchard (or Humphrey ap Richard) and Charles Mahoney – have Welsh connections, and two – William Gibson and George Douglas – have Scottish connections. In the Welsh calendar, 25 October is still kept as a distinct feast of the 'Six Welsh Martyrs and their companions', as the Forty canonised Martyrs are known in Wales.

Historical context and treason accusations

Queen Elizabeth I was excommunicated by Pope Pius V, on 25 February 1570, creating a situation full of perplexity for English Roman Catholics. Once this declaration was made, a number of Catholics acted on it, and a number, under the influence of Spanish ambassador Bernardino de Mendoza and others, were implicated in plots against Elizabeth which were undoubtedly treasonable from the English Government's point of view. That a certain party of English Catholics was in rebellion against Elizabeth is not disputed. Thus William Allen, with many of the exiles of Douai and Louvain, and Robert Persons, with many of the Jesuits, saw in the rule of Elizabeth a greater danger to the highest interests of England than had previously been threatened in cases where history had justified the deposition of kings. And the supreme authority had sanctioned this view.

In the eyes of Elizabeth and her ministers, such opposition was nothing less than high treason. But a large number of English Catholics refused to go so far as rebellion. As John Lingard writes: 

The next pope, Gregory XIII, on 14 April 1580 issued a declaration that although Elizabeth and her abettors remained subject to the excommunication, it was not to be binding on Catholics to their detriment. The majority of English Roman Catholics then did not give the royal government grounds for suspecting their loyalty, but they persisted in the practice of their religion, which was made possible only by the coming of the seminary priests. After the Northern Rising, Parliament had passed a statute (13 Eliz. c. 2) declaring it to be high treason to put into effect any papal Bull of absolution to absolve or reconcile any person to the Church of Rome, to be absolved or reconciled, or to procure or publish any papal Bull or writing whatsoever. Purely religious acts were declared by Parliament to be treasonable.

Elizabeth's government, for its own purposes, refused to make any distinction between Catholics who had been engaged in open opposition to the Queen and those who were forced by conscience to ignore the provisions of this statute of 1571. All were purposely identified by the government and treated as one for controversial purposes.

This view was put forward officially in a pamphlet by William Cecil, Lord Burghley: 

 
In it, Burghley gave no credit to Catholic priests risking their lives for any religious purpose, but opined "the seminary fugitives come secretly into the realm to induce the people to obey the Pope's bull."
Under the Act of 1585, it became high treason for any seminary priest, or any Jesuit, simply to come to England; and felony for any person to harbour or relieve them. Burghley insists that before the excommunication no one had been charged with capital crimes on the ground of religion, and brings everything back to the question of the Bull. The pamphlet ends by proposing six questions or tests by which traitors might be distinguished from simple scholars (the so-called "bloody questions").

Contemporary controversy

William Allen, in his Answer to the Libel of English Justice published in 1584, joined issue on all points, stating "that many priests and other Catholics in England have been persecuted, condemned and executed for mere matter of religion and for transgression only of new statutes which make cases of conscience to be treason without all pretence or surmise of any old treasons or statutes for the same". He defended Edmund Campion and the other martyrs from the imputation of treason.

See also
Forty Martyrs of England and Wales
List of Catholic martyrs of the English Reformation
Catholic Church in England and Wales
Marian Persecutions
Oxford Martyrs

Notes

Further reading
Bowden, Henry Sebastian. Mementoes of the Martyrs and Confessors of England & Wales [1910]. New edition revised by Donald Attwater. London. Burns & Oates, 1962.
Challoner, Richard. Memoirs of Missionary Priests, [1741]. New edition revised by J.H. Pollen. London. Burns Oates and Washbourne, 1924.
Connelly, Roland. The Eighty-five Martyrs. Essex. McCrimmons Publishing Company, 1987.
Foley, B.C. The Eighty-five Blessed Martyrs. London. Incorporated Catholic Truth Society. 1987.
Usherwood, Stephen and Elizabeth. We die for the Old Religion. London. Sheed & Ward. 1987.

External links
George Haydock and Eighty Four companions at Hagiography Circle
 

 
 Eighty-five
English Reformation
History of Catholicism in England
Lists of Christian martyrs
1584 deaths
Beatifications by Pope John Paul II